The Nightingale is a 1914 American silent drama film directed and written by Augustus Thomas and released by Alco Film Corporation. It is the feature film debut of Ethel Barrymore in a story written especially for her by Thomas. Thomas, famed as a Broadway playwright, was the best friend of Barrymore's father Maurice and had known the actress since she was a child. As with many of Barrymore's films to come, the advertising for this film says the film is told in 'acts' as with a stage play, an effort to remind the audience of the star's status and preference for the legitimate stage. This film is long thought to be lost.

Cast
Ethel Barrymore as Isola Franti, 'The Nightingale'
William Courtleigh as Tony Franti
Frank Andrews as Andrea Franti
Conway Tearle as Charles Marden
Charles A. Stevenson as Nathan Narden
Irving Brooks as 'Red' Galvin
Mario Majeroni as David Mantz
Philip Hahn as Jean de Resni
Ida Darling as Mrs. Belmore
Bobby Stewart as Nathan Marden II
Henri Antiznat as Prefect of Police
Frank Dudley as Frank
M. Monet as Gazzi Catassi
Caroline French as Maid
Mrs. Cooper Cliffe as Nola
Claude Cooper as Madonni
Ed West as Police Sergeant

Production
The story of this film is similar to Clyde Fitch's 1901 play Captain Jinks of the Horse Marines in which Barrymore became a star playing an Italian opera singer. Fitch had died in 1909 and Charles Frohman, Barrymore's theatrical employer, owned the rights to Captain Jinks. Augustus Thomas, a Barrymore family friend and author, fashioned a similar story for Barrymore enticing her make a film with material she was familiar with. This was common practice in the silent era to make a write-around story to popular works in which screen rights could not be attained.

A screen version of Fitch's Captain Jinks was later made with Ann Murdock.

References

External links
The Nightingale at IMDb.com
allmovie/synopsis(*note this film was not based on a play as AMG states, it was written especially for the star)
Moving Picture World advertisement

1914 films
1914 drama films
Silent American drama films
American silent feature films
Lost American films
American black-and-white films
1914 lost films
Lost drama films
1910s American films